Jiandao or Chientao, known in Korean as Gando or Kando, is a historical border region along the north bank of the Tumen River in Jilin Province, Northeast China that has a high population of ethnic Koreans. The word "Jiandao" itself, literally "Middle Island", was initially referred to a shoal in Tumen River between today's Chuankou Village, Kaishantun in Longjing, Jilin, China and Chongsŏng, Onsong County in North Korea. The island was an important landmark for immigrants from the Korean Peninsula looking for settlements across the river. As the number of immigrants increased, the area that the word "Jiandao" gradually changed to reflect the areas of Korean settlement.

In the early 20th century, an expanding Japanese Empire argued that ethnic Koreans living in this area should be placed under its jurisdiction. As one of its first set of attempts to annex northeast China and conquer other parts of mainland China, Imperial Japanese forces in Korea invaded Jiandao in 1907, but Japan withdrew its forces to Korea in 1909 and recognized the border that was present along Tumen River before the invasion, under diplomatic pressure from China.

The Yanbian Korean Autonomous Prefecture of present-day Jilin Province covers roughly the same region as historical Jiandao. The prefecture is approximately 42,000 square kilometers in size and home to about 810,000 ethnic Koreans.

In China, Yanbian is the name used, and Jiandao is not used, due to its association with Japanese colonial occupation. Both North Korea and South Korea recognize the region as a part of the People's Republic of China, but there are some liberal and left-wing nationalist elements in South Korea that endorse the idea that the region should be a part of modern-day Korea. These groups claim what happened in Jiandao between 1907–1909 (Japan's invasion and subsequent withdrawal) was an illegal transfer of Korean territory between Japan and China.

History 
Many different states and tribes succeeded each other in ruling the area during ancient times. These included Buyeo, Goguryeo and Goguryeo's successor state Balhae. Goguryeo was a country that controlled northern Korea and southern Manchuria, being widely regarded as one of the Three Kingdoms of Korea. Balhae was a state that existed in the area during the Tang dynasty in China and the Unified Silla Period in Korea. China emphasizes Balhae's temporary tributary relationship to the Tang, while Korea emphasizes that Balhae was a successor state and a cultural extension of Goguryeo.

Balhae was destroyed by the Khitan Liao dynasty in 926, and was formally annexed in 936. Over the next nine to ten centuries the region was administered by the Liao (Khitans), Jin (Jurchens), Yuan (Mongols), Ming and finally, the Qing, which was established by Manchus. Eventually, the Qing dynasty succeeded in unifying China by replacing the Ming dynasty.

In 1712, the border between Qing and Joseon was formally demarcated. For years, Qing officials did not allow people to move to Northeastern China, as it believed that should a Han majority government rise again in parts of China south of the Great Wall, the Manchus could retreat to their original homeland. Joseon officials also did not allow its subjects to move to Northeastern China. These governmental regulations, with the general marshy nature of the area, left these lands north of the Tumen River relatively undeveloped and the region was sparsely populated by Manchu tribes for a long time. Qing officials regularly inspected this region and occasional Korean intruders were detained and sent back to Korea. However, by the late 19th century, peasants in northern Korea migrated to northeast China to flee famine and poverty. Even more arrived as refugees when Japan invaded Korea in 1894.

From 1901, The Korean Empire prepared the invasion of Jiandao and take control of the area. In order to invade, Korean General Yi Hak-gyun, Diplomat Sands in Korea, and captain Payeur was sent to observe Jiandao. The French envoy, Victor Collin de Plancy, reported that Korean government is trying to get taxes from the people, increase their influence, and supplying jobs by sending officials there. The Russian legation was opposed the invasion because this might cause the loss of Korea's territory. Korean government tried to colonize Jiandao. In 1901, Korea deployed police force in Jiandao, which was active until 1906. The Korean Government sent Yi Beom-yun, who was not part of the Imperial Korean Army, as a Jiandao observer to invade Jiando in 1903. In Jiandao, Yi established Sa-po dae, which is militia consisted of Righteous army, and Imperial Korean Army. This army fought against Japan during the Russo-Japanese War. The Korean government claimed that there is no document that explicits Jiandao being part of the Qing territory.

After the Russo-Japanese War, Japan began the process that led to the formal annexation of Korea. In 1905, the Korean Empire became a protectorate of the Imperial Japan, effectively losing diplomatic rights, and became a part of the Imperial Japan in 1910. In the early 20th century, Korean immigration to Manchuria steadily increased, either by refugees fleeing from Japanese rule, or from encouragement by the Japanese government for people to develop the land. Some local Chinese governments welcomed the Korean immigrants, as they were a source of labor and agricultural skill.

In the meantime, Japan began to expand into northeast China. One of the regions the Japanese targeted was Jiandao (known in Korean as Gando). The Japanese claimed that Jiandao included territory of four counties (Yanji, Wangqing, Helong and Hunchun) of Jilin Province. The Japanese further claimed ethnic Koreans living in this region should be placed under the jurisdiction of Imperial Japan.

The Japanese first infiltrated Jiandao in April 1907 to collect information and data. On August 7, 1907, Japanese troops invaded Jiandao and claimed that the "Jiandao Issue" was "unsettled" (see reference: Jiandao Massacre).

In the Jiandao Convention of 1909, Japan affirmed territorial rights of the Qing over Jiandao after the Chinese foreign ministry issued a thirteen-point refutation statement regarding its rightful ownership. Japan agreed to withdraw its invading troops back to Korea in two months. The treaty also contained provisions for the protection and rights of ethnic Koreans under Chinese rule. Nevertheless, there were large Korean settlements and the area remained under significant Japanese influence.

Despite the agreement, Koreans in Jiandao continued to be a source of friction between the Chinese and Japanese governments. Japan maintained that all ethnic Koreans were Japanese nationals, subject to Japanese jurisdiction and law, and demanded rights to patrol and police the area.  The Qing and subsequent local Chinese governments insisted on its territorial sovereignty over the region.

After the Mukden Incident of 1931, the Japanese military (the Kwantung Army) invaded Manchuria. Between 1931 and 1945, Manchuria was under the control of Manchukuo, a Japanese puppet state. From 1934 the area formed a new Jiandao Province of Manchukuo after the old Jilin Province was split into Binjiang, Jiandao and a rump Jilin.  This period initiated a new wave of Korean immigration, as the Japanese government actively encouraged (or forced) Korean settlement in order to colonize and develop the region. The Japanese also moved to suppress resistance in the region. Within three and half years (from September 1931 to March 1935), Japanese regular forces and police murdered 4520 people. During and after the 1930s, many ethnic Koreans in the region joined and participated in the Chinese Communist Party.

In December 1938, a counterinsurgency unit called the Gando Special Force was organized by the Japanese Kwantung Army to combat communist guerrillas within the region. The top commander of this battalion-size force was Japanese. Historian Philip Jowett noted that during the Japanese occupation of Manchuria, the Gando Special Force had "earned a reputation for brutality and was reported to have laid waste to large areas which came under its rule."

On 1 October 1943, Jiandao Province was incorporated as a district into the Dongman Consolidated Province but this district was itself abolished on 28 May 1945 and Jiandao was once again a province.

After World War II and the liberation of Korea, many Korean expatriates in the region moved back to Korea, but a significant number still remained in Manchuria; descendants of these people form much of the Korean ethnic minority in China today.  The area was first nominally part of the Republic of China's new Songjiang Province but with the communist seizure of power in 1949, Sonjiang's borders were changed and Jiandao became part of Jilin Province.

The area is now the Yanbian Korean Autonomous Prefecture in Jilin.

Boundary claims 

The claims by some of the Korean irredentists over Gando stem from what is perceived as an ambiguity in the original Sino-Korean boundary agreement.

After several attempts by the Kangxi Emperor to negotiate the issue, in 1712, the Joseon of Korea and Qing of China agreed to delineate the boundaries of the two countries at the Yalu and Tumen Rivers. The Qing delegation was led by Mukedeng, and the Joseon delegation was led by Pak Kwon, and the two held a joint commission to survey and demarcate the boundaries between the two states.  Efforts were taken to locate the sources of the Yalu and Tumen rivers at Baekdu Mountain. Owing to Pak's age, they agreed for Mukedeng's team to ascend the summit alone. Mukedeng's team quickly identified the source of the Yalu, but identification for the Tumen proved more complicated. At last a spot was decided, and a stele was erected as a boundary marker. Over the next year, a fence was built to demarcate the areas where the Tumen river ran underground.

Pak Kwon was instructed by the Joseon government to retain all territory south of the Yalu and Tumen rivers, a goal he accomplished. However, some Korean officials lamented the loss of claims on areas north of the river and criticized Pak Kwon for not accompanying Mukedeng to the summit. The territorial claims stem from the territories held by Goguryeo and Balhae (see history section regarding the description of these two states). Nonetheless, the border remained uncontentious for the next 150 years. Cross-border movements were forbidden, and was punishable by death after trespassers were detained and repatriated back to their respective countries.

In the 1870s the Qing government reversed its policy of prohibiting entry to Manchuria, and began allowing Han Chinese settlers into the territory in response to growing Russian encroachment. The area around Gando was opened up to settlement in 1881, but Chinese settlers quickly discovered some Korean farming communities already settled in the area. It was apparent that despite the decreed punishment, severe droughts in northern Korea had motivated Korean farmers to seek new lands. The Jilin general-governor Ming-An's official response was to lodge a protest to the Joseon government and offer to allow the Korean population to stay if they agreed to become Qing subjects and adopt Qing customs and dress. Joseon's response was to encourage the farmers not to register as Qing subjects but to return to Korea within the year.

The farmers, unwilling to abandon their homes, argued that because of the ambiguity in the naming of the Tumen river, they were actually already in Korean territory. The Yalu River boundary is of little dispute, but the interpretation of the Tumen River boundary 土門 (토문) causes problems. The name of the river itself originates from the Jurchen word tumen, meaning "ten thousand". The official boundary agreement in 1712 identified the Tumen river using the characters 土門 (pinyin: Tǔmen) for the phonetic transcription. However, the modern Tumen River is written as 圖們 (pinyin: Túmen) in modern Chinese and as 豆滿 (두만) "Duman" in both modern Korean and Japanese. Some Koreans hence claim that the "Tumen" referred to in the treaty is actually a tributary of the Songhua River. Under this interpretation, Gando (where the Koreans settled) would be part of Korean territory.

This confusion arises as the two names sound identical, and neither name is of Chinese origin. The two rivers can be seen in the following map from the period. Korean claims are based on maps showing the border river as 土門 and the claim that this is a different river than the one used for the modern border. However, it is uncertain which modern river the Korean claim corresponds to, as there is no modern tributary of the Songhua River with that name:

Satellite view of same location; Baekdu Mountain, Lake Tianchi, and the Tumen River are visible
Satellite view of the Songhua river and Baekdu Mountain, for comparison purposes

This interpretation of the boundary gradually developed into Joseon official policy. O Yunjung, a Korean official appointed to review the claims made by the farmers and investigate the sources of the river, adopted the latter interpretation and declared that the region did not belong to China. Joseon and Qing officials met in 1885 and 1887 to resolve the dispute, but with little result. Korean officials suggested on starting from the stele and tracing the river downwards, while Qing officials proposed starting at the mouth of the Tumen River and moving upstream. From 1905 onwards, Korea came under the influence and control of Japan and was unable to effectively pursue these claims.

After the liberation of Korea in 1945, some Koreans believed that Jiandao should be given to Korean rule, but the military control by United States of America in the south and Union of Soviet Socialist Republics in the north hindered any unified Korean claim to the territory. The chaos of the Korean War and the geopolitical situation of the Cold War effectively diminished any opportunity for Koreans to highlight the Gando issue. In 1962, North Korea signed a boundary treaty with People's Republic of China setting the Korean boundary at Yalu and Tumen, effectively foregoing territorial claims to Gando.  South Korea also recognizes this as the boundary between Korea and China.

Today, none of the governments involved (North Korea, South Korea, People's Republic of China, or Japan) make the claim that Gando is Korean territory. In addition, there is very little enthusiasm for irredentism among the Korean minority in China.  Although there are occasional arguments over historical interpretation, this issue arouses very little emotion or official interest on the part of any of the parties, and relations between China and both Koreas remain warm.

In 2004 the South Korean government issued a statement to the effect that it believed that the Gando Convention was null and void.  The resultant controversy and strong negative reaction from the PRC led to a retraction of the statement, along with an explanation that its issuance was an "administrative error."

A small number of South Korean activists believe that under a unified Korea, the treaties signed by North Korea can be deemed null, allowing the unified Korea to actively seek regress for Gando. However, the current political situation makes this a faint possibility at best. Also, some scholars claim that China's efforts to incorporate the history of Goguryeo and Balhae into Chinese history is an effectively pre-emptive move to squash any territorial disputes that might arise regarding Gando before a unified Korea can claim such or the Korean ethnic minority in the Manchuria region claim to become part of Korea.

Images
The following maps, made by Korea from the 18th century to the 19th century, show Sino-Korean borders to be aligned along the Yalu and Tumen Rivers, essentially the same as those today (between China and North Korea):

However there is an exception in the last map, as it shows the border visibly protruding north of the Tumen River.

Some Korean claims to Gando are based on other maps. The following were made by western missionaries. However, the first is explicitly stated as a map of "Quan-Tong Province" (now Liaoning province, China) and Kau-li (Korea), and the second is stated as a map of the Chinese Tartary (la Tartarie Chinoise). Compared to the Korean-made maps above, the coastlines and rivers are also significantly less accurate, but the Sino-Korean border is not placed at the Yalu/Amnok River, which is quite clear in the following maps:

Note that two almost identical versions of a first map exists, showing significant differences in the border. One shows the boundaries similar to modern-day province and country borders, while the other shows the Sino-Korean border significantly further north.

See also
Gando Convention
Heaven Lake
Yanbian Korean Autonomous Prefecture

References

Citations

Sources

Notes

External links
 China shock for South Korea

Geography of Jilin
Wetlands of China
History of Jilin
Provinces of Manchukuo
Geography of Yanbian
History of Yanbian
Koreans in China
Anti-Chinese sentiment in South Korea
Anti-imperialism in Korea
Anti-Japanese sentiment in South Korea